Baraboo is a city in the Midwest and the county seat of Sauk County, Wisconsin, United States. The largest city in the county, Baraboo is the principal city of the Baraboo Micropolitan Statistical Area which comprises a portion of the Madison Combined Statistical area. Its 2020 population was 12,556. It is situated on the Baraboo River.

Baraboo is home to the Circus World Museum, the former headquarters and winter home of the Ringling brothers circus. The Al. Ringling Theatre is an active landmark in the city. Baraboo is also near Devil's Lake State Park, and Aldo Leopold's Shack and Farm.

History

Early settlement 
The area around Baraboo was the site of a Kickapoo village as early as 1665. The current community was established by Abe Wood in 1838, and was originally known as the village of Adams. In 1839 several settlers arrived and started building cabins, and a saw mill. In 1846 it became the county seat of Sauk County after a fierce fight with the nearby village of Reedsburg. In 1852, the village was renamed "Baraboo", after the nearby river. It was incorporated as a village in 1866 and as a city in 1882. In the 1860s, the city had surpassed a population of 2,000, and many businesses started to form, including grocery stores, banks, and hotels. In 1872, the Chicago and North Western Railway (C&NW) was built. Baraboo became home to several saw mills during this time, because of its location near the Baraboo and Wisconsin Rivers.

Late 1800s to the present 
In 1884, the Ringling Brothers Circus was established in Baraboo. Several other circuses came to the city, which gave Baraboo the nickname "Circus City".

Located south of Baraboo, in the Census-designated place of Bluffview, was the Badger Army Ammunition Plant, which was the largest munitions factory in the world during WWII, when it was known as "Badger Ordnance Works". It was later demolished and now the land is a part of the Sauk Prairie Recreation Area.

Hank Snow's 1959 song "I've Been Everywhere", famously covered by Johnny Cash, mentions visiting Baraboo.

Cirrus Aircraft, a manufacturer of single-engine aircraft, was founded in a rural Baraboo barn in 1984 by brothers Alan and Dale Klapmeier. After a few years of designing the VK-30, the company relocated to the Baraboo–Wisconsin Dells Airport, and in 1994 moved to its present-day home in Duluth, Minnesota.

Geography

West Baraboo, a suburb of Baraboo, borders the city on its west side.

Baraboo gives its name to the Baraboo Syncline, a doubly plunging, asymmetric syncline in Proterozoic-aged Baraboo quartzite. Researchers at the University of Wisconsin, particularly Charles R. Van Hise, used the syncline to demonstrate that small-scale deformational structures in isolated outcrops reflect larger regional structures and that sedimentary structures could indicate the original top-facing direction within elaborately deformed strata. These two principles sparked a global revolution in structural geology during the 1920s.

The nearby Baraboo Hills are designated one of the "Last Great Places" by the Nature Conservancy because of its rare rocks, plants and animals. The hills were created by glacial action, and in some points poke up from the flat terrain to form a stark contrast. Some of these features were created when a glacial pocket was formed during the Wisconsin glaciation where the advance of the glacier halted, along the edge of what is known as the Driftless Area. Devil's Lake State Park, Wisconsin's largest state park, contains large areas of the Baraboo Hills. Pewits Nest is located outside Baraboo.

Climate

Demographics

Baraboo forms the core of the United States Census Bureau's Baraboo Micropolitan Statistical Area, which includes all of Sauk County (2000 population: 55,225). The Baraboo µSA is just northwest of the Madison metropolitan area, with which it forms the Census Bureau's Baraboo-Madison Consolidated Metropolitan Statistical Area.

2020 census
As of the census of 2020, the population was 12,556. The racial makeup of the city was 88.0% White, 1.4% Native American, 1.3% Black or African American, 1.0% Asian, 2.7% from other races, and 5.6% from two or more races. Ethnically, the population was 5.9% Hispanic or Latino of any race.

2010 census
As of the census of 2010, there were 12,048 people, 5,161 households, and 3,016 families residing in the city. The racial makeup of the city was 94.0% White, 1.3% African American, 1.0% Native American, 0.5% Asian, 0.1% Pacific Islander, 1.5% from other races, and 1.6% from two or more races. Hispanic or Latino of any race were 3.7% of the population.

There were 5,161 households, of which 30.2% had children under the age of 18 living with them, 41.1% were married couples living together, 11.8% had a female householder with no husband present, 5.5% had a male householder with no wife present, and 41.6% were non-families. 34.4% of all households were made up of individuals, and 14.7% had someone living alone who was 65 years of age or older. The average household size was 2.26 and the average family size was 2.89.

The median age in the city was 38 years. 23.8% of residents were under the age of 18; 8% were between the ages of 18 and 24; 27.5% were from 25 to 44; 25.1% were from 45 to 64; and 15.6% were 65 years of age or older. The gender makeup of the city was 49.1% male and 50.9% female.

2000 census 
As of the census of 2000, there were 10,711 people, 4,467 households, and 2,733 families residing in the city.  The population density was 2,030.2 people per square mile
(783.2/km2).  There were 4,718 housing units at an average density of 894.3 per square mile (345.0 persons/km2). The racial makeup of the city was 97.12% White, 0.51% African American, 0.77% Native American, 0.52% Asian, 0.00% Pacific Islander, 0.41% from other races, and 0.66% from two or more races. 1.57% of the population were Hispanic or Latino of any race.

There were 4,467 households, out of which 31.0% had children under the age of 18 living with them, 46.9% were married couples living together, 10.8% had a female householder with no husband present, and 38.8% were non-families. 32.1% of all households were made up of individuals, and 13.5% had someone living alone who was 65 years of age or older.  The average household size was 2.33 and the average family size was 2.96.

In the city, the population was spread out, with 24.9% under the age of 18, 8.8% from 18 to 24, 30.5% from 25 to 44, 20.1% from 45 to 64, and 15.7% who were 65 years of age or older.  The median age was 36 years.  For every 100 females, there were 93.0 males.  For every 100 females age 18 and over, there were 90.0 males.

The median income for a household in the city was $38,375, and the median income for a family was $48,149. Males had a median income of $32,775 versus $22,813 for females. The per capita income for the city was $19,304.  6.6% of the population and 4.7% of families were below the poverty line, including 6.7% of those under the age of 18 and 10.0% of those age 65 or older.

Infrastructure
Baraboo includes the Downtown Baraboo Historic District, which consists of 75 commercial and civic buildings built between 1870 and 1938. The Sauk County Courthouse is in the center of the district, and it serves the county.

Transportation 
The Baraboo-Wisconsin Dells Airport  (KDLL) serves the city and surrounding communities, and is located on Bus. US 12 3 miles north of the city. State Highways 33, 113, 136, and U.S. 12 pass through Baraboo. There is access to Interstate 90/94 nearby.

Government
A city hall building opened in 1967, and another location finished construction in 2018 at a cost of $9 million.

A post office opened in 1961.

Education

The School District of Baraboo has four elementary schools serving students in grades 1 through 5, one kindergarten center, one middle school and one high school (Baraboo High School).

The middle school has a swimming pool that can be accessed by the public with a seasonal membership option. There are also three parochial schools: St. Joseph's Catholic School, which serves Pre-K through sixth grade; St. John's Lutheran School of the WELS, serving Pre-K through eighth grade; and Community Christian School, serving 4K through high school.

St. Joseph's Catholic, under the Roman Catholic Diocese of Madison, is a parochial school. The current school building, designed by the Wisconsin Rapids company Billmeyer and Sons and with a cost of over $500,000, has 11 classrooms. The basement has a cafeteria and a combination auditorium/gymnasium. The second building for the school opened on a filled-in ravine in 1912, northeast of its associated church. The building had three floors and a basement. The first and second floors each had three classrooms, and the second floor also housed the chapel and the library. The third floor had a 600-seat auditorium while the basement had a large banquet hall/gymnasium.  The second building became overcrowded due to the post-World War II baby boom, so the third school building, north of the second building, opened in 1958.

A campus of the University of Wisconsin–Baraboo/Sauk County (known to local residents as "Boo-U") is located in Baraboo.

The Baraboo Public Library serves the community. The former Free Congregational Society church was demolished by 1902 for the library's construction.

Historic sites
The Aldo Leopold Shack and Farm. celebrated in his book A Sand County Almanac (1949), is near Baraboo.
The Gust Brothers' Store is in Baraboo.
The Walworth D. Porter Duplex Residence is in Baraboo.

Notable people

 Donald R. Atkinson, educator and writer
 Frank Avery, Wisconsin State Senator
 Stan Barnes, judge, United States Court of Appeals for the Ninth Circuit
 Virgil H. Cady, Wisconsin State Representative
 Tiny Cahoon, NFL player
 Jorge A. Carow, Wisconsin State Representative
 Ella D. Crawford, temperance movement organizer
 John V. Diener, mayor of Green Bay, Wisconsin
 Evan Alfred Evans, judge of the U.S. Court of Appeals
 Evan Glodell, film director, producer, writer, and actor
 Elna Jane Hilliard Grahn, educator
 Henry C. Hansbrough, U.S. Senator from North Dakota
 John R. Hofstatter, Wisconsin State Representative
 Guy E. Holmes, musician and composer
 John J. Jenkins, U.S. Representative
 Robert J. Keller, Wisconsin State Representative
 Len Koenecke, MLB player
 Belle Case La Follette, lawyer and activist
 Aldo Leopold, naturalist
 Daryl Morey, former general manager of the Houston Rockets (2007–2020), currently the President of Basketball Operations for the Philadelphia 76ers
 Mary Mortimer (1816–1877), British-born American educator
 Beryl Newman, Medal of Honor recipient
 John Ringling North, circus
 Stuart Palmer, mystery novelist
 Delando Pratt, Wisconsin State Representative
 Mike Reinfeldt, NFL player and executive
 Cyrus Remington, Wisconsin State Representative and jurist
 Bradbury Robinson, threw the first forward pass in football history, grew up in Baraboo
 Algie Martin Simons, Socialist newspaper editor, attended high school in Baraboo
 Terry Stieve, NFL player
 Walter Terry, Wisconsin legislator
 John M. True, Wisconsin legislator
 C. F. Viebahn, Wisconsin State Representative
 David Vittum, Wisconsin State Senator
 Lewis N. Wood, Wisconsin State Representative
 Edwin E. Woodman, Wisconsin State Senator

Notes

External links

City of Baraboo

 
Cities in Wisconsin
Cities in Sauk County, Wisconsin
Micropolitan areas of Wisconsin
County seats in Wisconsin
Populated places established in 1838
1838 establishments in Wisconsin Territory